The North Eastern League Cup was a regional Scottish football competition held during the Second World War, due to the suspension of Scottish Football League. Held between 1941 and 1945, the competition was played in two stages each season (autumn and spring), mirroring the North Eastern League.

Aberdeen dominated the tournament, winning five times overall. Indeed, they appeared in six of the eight finals, only losing the second series in the 1941–42 season. Rangers 'A' (the Glasgow club's reserve team) won both series in the 1943–44 season and Dundee United won the remaining tournament.

The North Eastern League Cup helped to contribute to the present-day Scottish League Cup: it was also merged with its Southern equivalent in the 1945–46 season, with the nationwide competition proving popular (the final, won by Aberdeen, attracted a crowd of crowd of 135,000 at Hampden Park). It was thus continued on those lines on an official basis from then on.

As the war ended, regular league football returned in 1946, with the regional leagues and cups disbanded.

1941–42

First Series

|}
Ties played 13 and 20 Dec

Second Series

|}
Ties played 16 and 23 May

1942–43

First Series

|}
Ties played 19 and 26 Dec

Second Series

|}
Ties played 8, 15 and 22 May  – the first tie on 8 May was abandoned due to poor weather

1943–44

First Series

|}
Ties played 25 Dec and 31 Jan

Second Series

|}
Ties played 6 and 13 May

1944–45

First Series

|}
Tie played 1 Jan

Second Series

|}
Ties played 23 and 30 Jun

References

Defunct football cup competitions in Scotland
Wartime football in Scotland
1941 establishments in Scotland
1945 disestablishments in Scotland
Recurring sporting events established in 1941
Recurring sporting events disestablished in 1945